The Alliance – Alternative for Norway is a political party in Norway. It was founded on 22 November 2016 and registered in the Party Register by Hans Jørgen Lysglimt Johansen on 5 January 2017.

History
In 2016 Hans Jørgen Lysglimt Johansen profiled himself as a Donald Trump supporter. A party initiative with the same name was earlier this autumn initiated by Mikkel Dobloug where Christian Tybring-Gjedde was intended as leader.

Ideology
The Alliance has formed a largely online neo-Nazi network, mostly of teenagers who post memes and internet trolling with racist and antisemitic messages on platforms such as Discord. The party's leader is known for a number of grossly anti-Semitic statements and has friendly contacts with the Nordic Resistance Movement.

According to Lysglimt Johansen, the main issue for the Alliance is to get Norway out of the EEA and Schengen agreements with the EU. The party is also concerned about stopping immigration as well as changes in the democratic system.

The Alliance has been criticized for repeatedly expressing xenophobia and racist attitudes. A number of prominent politicians from the Progress Party to the Red have therefore publicly distanced themselves from the Alliance.

Political scientist Hilmar Mjelde describes the Alliance as right-wing populist and radical and a variant of Donald Trump's political style and platform. Lysglimt Johansen distinguished himself during the election campaign in 2016 as a pronounced Trump supporter in Norway. Mjelde describes the party as Lysglimt Johansen's private enterprise and a personalist party in the same way as Mogens Glistrup's party in Denmark, Anders Lange's party in Norway and Silvio Berlusconi's Forza Italia. Lysglimt Johansen has made it clear that the Alliance was based on Trump's political success, and that he is particularly pleased with Trump, seeing him as a masculine role model who stands for change and against fake news.

The Alliance does not have a traditional party program. The party is based on nationalist ideas and slogans such as "Norway first!". Opposition to immigration appears from the party's statements to be essential alongside national sovereignty. Carline Tromp writes that the Alliance's wording is reminiscent of the alt-right.

Election results

References

Alt-right organizations
Political parties in Norway
Far-right political parties in Norway
Neo-Nazism in Norway
Neo-Nazi political parties in Europe